Samuel Lane Jean (born November 10, 1958) is a Republican member of the Arkansas House of Representatives for District 2, which includes parts of Lafayette, Miller, and Columbia counties in south Arkansas. He has held the District 2 seat since January 2013. From 2011 to 2013, he was the representative for District 4. He was elected in 2012 by his colleagues as the House Republican Whip under then Majority Leader Bruce Westerman of Hot Springs  and subsequent Speaker of the Arkansas House of Representatives Davy Carter of Cabot in Lonoke County, who was elected as the presiding officer of the House in 2013.

Background
Jean's mother, Katheryn "Kitty" Reeves Jean (1929-2007), a native of Birmingham, Alabama, was the president of Reeves Land and Timber Company of Magnolia. She was active for many years in the Republican Party in Columbia County. Jean has a brother, Hal H. Jean (born 1954) of Magnolia.

Jean graduated from Magnolia High School and attended Abilene Christian University in Abilene, Texas. In 1984, he received a Bachelor of Arts degree in history from Southern Arkansas University in Magnolia. He is a former SAU trustee and a former commissioner of the Arkansas Department of Economic Development.  He is a member of the Church of Christ.

Political career

From 1995 to 2010, Jean was the mayor of Magnolia. Earlier, like his mother, he was a Columbia County justice of the peace. He is engaged in the cattle, timber, and real estate businesses. He is a member of the Emerson Church of Christ in Emerson, AR. Jean is also affiliated with Rotary International and the Arkansas Municipal League. He and his wife, Judith, have two grown children, Kelli and Gray.

Jean won his District 4 House seat in the general election held on November 2, 2010; he succeeded the term-limited Democrat, Bruce Maloch, who was elected instead to the Arkansas State Senate. Jean defeated the Democratic nominee, Raymond Robertson, the owner of a former pharmacy store in  Welcome in Columbia County; the tabulation was 4,061 votes (52.5 percent)
to 3,671 (47.5 percent).

Jean serves on these House committees: (1) Agriculture, Forestry and Economic Development, (2) Revenue and Taxation, (3)  Public Retirement and Social Security Programs, (4) Budget. The latter two are joint House and Senate committees. Jean is opposed to abortion, having voted to ban the practice after twenty weeks of gestation or whenever fetal heartbeat is determined. He voted to allow university staff to carry concealed weapons and to require picture identification for voting.

In February 2015, Jean introduced legislation backed by dozens of his fellow Republicans and two Democrats to reduce unemployment compensation benefits. The measure was promptly signed into law by the newly elected Governor Asa Hutchinson.

References

1958 births
Living people
Republican Party members of the Arkansas House of Representatives
American members of the Churches of Christ
People from Magnolia, Arkansas
Mayors of places in Arkansas
County justices of the peace in Arkansas
Magnolia High School (Arkansas) alumni
Abilene Christian University alumni
Southern Arkansas University alumni
American real estate businesspeople
Businesspeople from Arkansas
20th-century American politicians
21st-century American politicians